Halomonas ventosae is a moderately halophilic, denitrifying, exopolysaccharide-producing bacterium. Its type strain is Al12T (=CECT 5797T =DSM 15911T).

References

Further reading

Zhu, Daochen, et al. "The synthesis and role of hydroxyectoine in halophilic bacterium Halomonas ventosae DL7." African Journal of Microbiology Research5.16 (2011): 2254–2260.

External links

LPSN
Type strain of Halomonas ventosae at BacDive – the Bacterial Diversity Metadatabase

Oceanospirillales
Bacteria described in 2004